Gladewater Independent School District is a public school district based in Gladewater, Texas (USA).

The District covers most of the towns of  Gladewater, Warren City, Clarksville City, and a very small portion of White Oak. Dr. Sedric G. Clark is the current Superintendent of Schools.

Schools
Gladewater High School (Grades 9-12)
Gladewater Middle (Grades 6-8)
Weldon Intermediate (Grades 2-5)
Gay Avenue Primary (Grades PK-1)

References

External links
Gladewater ISD

School districts in Gregg County, Texas
School districts in Smith County, Texas
School districts in Upshur County, Texas